Gold Symphony is the ninth studio album by Japanese music group AAA, released on October 1, 2014. The album includes four singles that were previously released — "Love", "Show Time" (where only the B-side "Circle" was repackaged, not the title track "Show Time" itself), "Wake up!" and "Sayonara no Mae ni", which had all peaked inside the top 5 of the Oricon weekly singles chart.

Track listing

Charts

References

2014 albums
AAA (band) albums
Avex Group albums